The Grand Rapids Public Schools is a public school district serving Grand Rapids, Michigan.

Grand Rapids Public Schools (GRPS) is Michigan's eight largest public school district. It is also the third-largest employer in the City of Grand Rapids. GRPS serves nearly 14,557 students with 2,700 employees, including 1,400 teachers. The student population represents 55 countries with 54 different languages spoken, creating a diverse educational experience.

History

Legal history 
Grand Rapids Public Schools was created in 1871, when the state legislature passed an act creating the Board of Education of the City of Grand Rapids. According to the act, the boundaries of the district were the same as the boundaries of the City of Grand Rapids. Prior to that time, the City of Grand Rapids had not established one single school district. Rather, the west side was known as the Union School District and the east side of the Grand River was served by two other districts.

In the days following 1871, the matters of the public schools and the matters of the city were much more intertwined than they are today since the school board's budget had to be submitted to the city for approval. In that time, when city boundaries were expanded, school boundaries expanded as well. The Constitution of 1908  prohibited special and local acts, so the city was expanded through annexation until the 1920s when the codified school law became more distinct. In 1962, the law stating that the boundaries for the city and the school district must be the same was repealed. Since then, enlargement of the city has not resulted in the expansion of the boundaries within the Grand Rapids Public Schools school district.

The relationship between GRPS and the city is very different than it was one hundred years ago. The city no longer has any control over the school budget, the district's bonding powers, or its borrowing powers. Currently, the city's basic responsibility is to conduct school elections and to collect school tax after the school board has determined how much tax should be levied. The legislature has continued to require that cities and schools operate separately.

School board history 
Prior to May 1906, the board of education had twenty-five members. Two of these members were elected from each of the twelve wards of the city, and the Mayor of Grand Rapids served as an ex-officio member. The election process was responsible for the poor location of many schools in Grand Rapids. Many schools were located according to a specific ward, rather than according to the needs of the city. In May 1906, the membership of the board was decreased to nine. Each member is now elected by the residents of the city as a whole and serves on the board for a three-year term.

Originally, the board occupied space on the first floor of City Hall, but by 1915 had complete use of the fourth floor of the building. Additional offices were located in the old North Division School at 234 North Division Avenue and the old Junior College Building on Ransom Avenue. The maintenance department was located at 425 West Pleasant Street in the former Pleasant Street School. In June 1920, the Board moved all its offices to the fifth floor of a new addition to the George A. Davis Vocational and Technical High School. This building later transitioned into the West Junior College Building. The new addition was specifically designed to hold these offices. One important factor in construction of the administrative offices was a 1927 City Commission imposed rental fee of $5,000 per year for the use of the space in City Hall. Prior to this time, the space had been rent free. However, the main factor for construction was increased efficiency and a desire to have all administrative personnel at one location.

Administrative history 
Administratively, the board initially used a dual system of control, where the superintendent of schools and the business manager were each directly responsible to the board. In 1937, the chief engineer also became responsible directly to the board of education; the chief engineer previously reported to the business manager.

On March 2, 1959, the administrative structure was changed so the superintendent of schools was the only employee directly responsible to the board. The business manager was placed under the superintendent of schools, and the Chief Engineer was assigned to report to the business manager.

In 2012 Theresa Weatherall Neall, the superintendent, received the approval from every member of the school board to save over $22.4 million in a five year period by closing ten school buildings.

Schools  
GRPS offers a large selection of school choices, including neighborhood, theme, Center of Innovation, special education, and charter. Neighborhood schools provide students with a traditional education. Located throughout the city, these schools are open to all students living within a specific attendance area. Pilot programs in select neighborhood schools are working to improve the connection between neighborhood residents and their local school.

Theme schools take the traditional curriculum and apply a theme to create a unique curriculum. Examples of themes available at GRPS include environmental science, arts and music, global studies, leadership, Montessori, International Baccalaureate, and more. In many GRPS theme schools, students also experience place based learning and thematic extracurricular activities. Of the theme schools, four require students to test-in. City High Middle School, one of the test-in schools, consistently ranks as the top performing school in West Michigan. Additionally, it is also ranked among the top schools in the state by U.S. News & World Report, and The Washington Post. By 2017 additional students were enrolling in theme schools.

Centers of Innovation are public-private partnerships that give students opportunities to connect with professional mentors. Furthermore, the Centers of Innovation offer job shadowing and internships, as well as the potential to earn college or trade school credits or career certification to prepare for in-demand careers.

GRPS also provides center-based special education services for students from throughout the Kent Intermediate School District (KISD). Students qualify for these services through the IEP team process. Additionally, GRPS has one charter elementary school, Grand Rapids Child Discovery Center. Schools may also offer services for English language learners; "community schools" with social, health, and mental health services;  all-day preschool; and all-day kindergarten.

Elementary schools
 Brookside Elementary (neighborhood)
 Buchanan Elementary (neighborhood)
 Burton Elementary (neighborhood)
 Campus Elementary (neighborhood)
 Cesar E. Chavez Elementary (neighborhood)
 Coit Creative Arts Academy (theme)
 Congress Elementary (neighborhood)
 East Leonard Elementary (neighborhood)
 Ken-O-Sha Park Elementary (neighborhood)
 Kent Hills Elementary (neighborhood)
 Mulick Park Elementary (neighborhood)
 Ridgemoor Park Montessori School - In the former Ridgemoor Park Child Development Center. GRPS renovated the school with $1.7 million and opened the Montessori school in 2017.
 Palmer Elementary (neighborhood)
 Sibley Elementary (neighborhood)
 Stocking Elementary (neighborhood) - Stocking closed in 2010. The school board had agreed to a proposal for Ojibway Development to buy the campus, with the developer stating that it would convert the school into apartments. Instead Stocking reopened in 2013, replacing Covell Elementary.

K–8 schools
 Aberdeen Academy (neighborhood)
 Dickinson Academy (neighborhood)
 Gerald R. Ford Academic Center (theme)
 Harrison Park (neighborhood)
 Martin Luther King, Jr. Leadership Academy (neighborhood)
 North Park Montessori (theme)
 Shawmut Hills (neighborhood)
 Sherwood Park Global Studies Academy (theme)
 Southwest Community Campus (theme)

Middle schools
Alger Middle School (neighborhood)
Blandford School (theme, 6th grade only)
Burton Middle School (neighborhood)
Center for Economicology (theme, 6th grade only)
Public Museum School (theme, opening fall 2015 with 6th grade and growing one grade per year)
Riverside Middle School (neighborhood)
Westwood Middle School (neighborhood)
Zoo School (theme, 6th grade only)

High schools
 City High-Middle School (theme, grades 7–12)
 Innovation Central High School (Center of Innovation)
 Ottawa Hills High School (neighborhood)
 Union High School (neighborhood)
 University Prep Academy (Center of Innovation, grades 6–12)

PreK–12
 CA Frost Environmental Science Academy (theme, grades PK–9 in fall 2015, growing one grade per year)
 The secondary school division is in the former Covell Elementary School. The district spent about $7.7 million to convert the former Covell Elementary. Its high school program began in 2016; this was done to retain 8th grade students who, hitherto to the start of the high school program, would matriculate to public schools in other districts, to charter schools, or to religious private schools.
 Grand Rapids Montessori (theme)

Other
 Straight School - Housed a program for Native American students and, starting in 2017, a vocational education program. It previously had a preschool program that closed in 2013.

Former schools
 Secondary
 Creston High School closed 2014
Central High School, closed 2014
South High School, closed 1968
 Adelante High School (alternative school)
 Primary
 Alexander Elementary School - Closed in 2010
 Campau Park Elementary School - The  property included a  school building. At the end of its life, it had approximately 220 students which was 52% of the school's official building capacity. At the time the State of Michigan considered the school a "priority school" meaning its academic performance was poor. The school closed in 2013. Covenant House Michigan acquired the school building in 2013 for $400,000. Since July 2013 the building served as the Covenant House Academy Grand Rapids.
 Covell Elementary School - It closed in 2013, with Stocking Elementary School, another campus previously closed, re-opening in its place. In 2016 the building was repurposed as the grade 6-10 campus of the C.A. Frost Environmental Science Academy.
 Heritage Child Development Center - In 2008 an Islamic organization, Masjid Muhammad Islamic Center, offered to purchase the building.
 Eastern Elementary School - Bruce Michael, the head of Berkley, Michigan-based Ojibway Development LLC, purchased the school from GRPS. He sold the building to National Heritage Academies, a charter school operator, on February 10, 2012. The district board believed it would be turned into apartments.
 Hillcrest Elementary School - The district sold the campus for $375,000 to Living Stones Academy. The sale occurred in 2014.
 Lexington Elementary School - Michael, who initially announced plans to make 25 apartment units out of this school, also sold this building to National Heritage on February 10, 2012. The district board believed it would be turned into apartments.
 Oakdale Elementary School - Michael also sold this building to National Heritage on February 10, 2012. The district board believed it would be turned into apartments. It became a charter school, River City Scholars Charter Academy. In 2012 the Mayor George Heartwell accused the developer of misleading the district.
 Park School - A Head Start program formerly occupied the building. Kent County Land Bank offered to buy the facility in 2016 so the organization Dwelling Place could develop apartments.
 Pine Elementary School - Opened in 1948, later housed Pine Academy, and closed in 2010 Kent County Land Bank offered to buy the facility in 2016 so the organization Dwelling Place could develop apartments.
 Ridgemoor Park Child Development Center - Became Ridgemoor Park Montessori
 Shawnee Park Math/Science/Technology Academy - The building, with grades K-5, had a capacity of 600. By 2013 most families in the local area preferred using religious private schools over public schools, and therefore the enrollment of the perennially under-utilized campus was 37% of its official capacity that year. The district closed the school in 2013. In September 2013 Grand Rapids Christian Schools offered to buy the building for $800,000. The district accepted the offer in 2014.
 Wellerwood Child Development Center - Now a part of North Park Montessori
 West Leonard Elementary School/West Leonard Child Development Center - It closed in 2013 as part of a wave of school closings. In 2014 W.L. Perry Associates offered to buy the school for $250,000. Cherry Street Capital, LLC, which wished to convert the facility into a residential building, offered the same amount of money in 2017.
 Special education
 GRPS operated the Kent Education Center (KEC) Mayfield in a Kent Intermediate School District-owned building. GRPS closed this program in 2013 and Kent ISD opened its own program in its place.

Other facilities
GRPS University, a district training center, is a former campus of City High Middle School.

References

Further reading
  - Snippets at Google Books

External links

Grand Rapids Public Schools official website

Education in Grand Rapids, Michigan
School districts in Michigan
Education in Kent County, Michigan
1871 establishments in Michigan